Let's All Go to Mary's House is a 1925 popular song written by Con Conrad & Leo Wood which was recorded in the UK by the Savoy Orpheans and by Jay Whidden and His New Midnight Follies Orchestra. It's a jazz dance song which exhibits the standard style of that time, and includes a reference to the Charleston which was less than a year old at this song's publication. The arrangements of the recordings mentioned uses the syncopation and popular orchestration typical of the time. It often appears on compilations of 1920s-era music as any internet search will reveal.

A cover version was released on the 2007 album Pour l'Amour des Chiens by the Bonzo Dog Doo-Dah Band.

See also
Jazz
1925 in music

1925 songs
Jazz songs
Songs with music by Con Conrad